Lindsey Durlacher (September 14, 1974 – June 4, 2011) was an American Greco-Roman wrestler whose career highlight was a bronze medal at the 2006 FILA Wrestling World Championships at 121 pounds. He was among the most accomplished wrestlers in Illinois history.

Early life
Durlacher was Jewish, and was born in Evanston, Illinois.  
He attended Riley Elementary School in Arlington Heights, Illinois, and Cooper Middle School in Buffalo Grove.

Wrestling career
He was a graduate of Buffalo Grove High School in Buffalo Grove, IL, going 44–0–1 in his senior year, where he later coached and mentored students.  He was a two-time All-American at the University of Illinois.

His career highlight was a bronze medal at the 2006 FILA Wrestling World Championships at 121 pounds.  Durlacher was also the 1991 Wisconsin state champion, second in the 1991 Junior Nationals, 1992 Wisconsin high school champion (103 pounds), 1993 Maccabiah Games champion, third in the 1994–95 University Nationals, second in the 1996–97 University Nationals, second in the 1997 NCAA Championships, 1997 Maccabiah Games champion, 2001 Maccabiah Games champion, second in the 2002 and 2003 U.S. Nationals, silver medalist in the 2003 Pan American Games, second in the 2004 and 2005 U.S. Nationals, 2005 Maccabiah Games champion, second in the 2007 U.S. Nationals, silver medalist in the 2007 Pan American Games, a member of the 2007 American world team champions, second in the 2007 and 2008 U.S. Nationals, and third in the 2009 U.S. Nationals.

Durlacher was also assistant coach at the University of Illinois, Northwestern, Northern Illinois University, and the U.S. Naval Academy.

Death
Durlacher suffered a broken sternum in a snowmobile accident in February 2011.  Durlacher had surgery for the injury in June 2011.  He died at the age of 36 in his sleep on June 4, 2011, three days after his surgery, at his home in Denver, Colorado.

Hall of Fame
He is a member of the Illinois Wrestling Coaches and Officials Association Hall of Fame.  In October 2016, Lindsey was inducted into the Greco Roman Wrestling Hall of Fame in a ceremony in Minneapolis, MN.

See also
List of select Jewish wrestlers

References

External links 
 Biography at TheMat.com

1974 births
2011 deaths
American male sport wrestlers
Sportspeople from Denver
Sportspeople from Evanston, Illinois
Wrestlers at the 2007 Pan American Games
Jewish American sportspeople
Maccabiah Games gold medalists for the United States
Competitors at the 1993 Maccabiah Games
Competitors at the 1997 Maccabiah Games
Competitors at the 2001 Maccabiah Games
World Wrestling Championships medalists
Pan American Games silver medalists for the United States
Pan American Games medalists in wrestling
Maccabiah Games medalists in wrestling
Medalists at the 2007 Pan American Games
21st-century American Jews